"Who Do U Love?" is a song recorded by the South Korean boy group Monsta X. It was released on June 14, 2019 also the first single from their first English-language album All About Luv. It peaked at number 26 on the US Billboard Mainstream Top 40 Airplay, becoming the group's first single to peak inside the said chart. It was also nominated for Best K-pop at the 2019 MTV Video Music Awards.

Background and release 
The song was initially released as a single on June 14, accompanied by a music video on June 21. It was later included in the group's first English-language album All About Luv, released in February 2020.

Critical reception 
According to Tamar Herman of Billboard, "Who Do U Love?" demands to be danced to as it is driven by a "blend of sleek bass, snappy beats, and shimmering synths" that create an "addicting, groovy melody" propelled by a "rhythmic choral hook".

Commercial performance 
In August 2019, the song debuted on Billboard Mainstream Top 40 Airplay and made Monsta X the second Korean group to reach this milestone, alongside BTS, followed by Blackpink and Loona.

Charts

Awards and nominations

See also 
 List of K-pop albums on the Billboard charts

References 

2019 songs
2019 singles
Starship Entertainment singles
Songs written by French Montana